Panagia Kontariotissa or Kountouriotissa, formally the Church of the Dormition of the Theotokos (Ιερός Ναός Κοιμήσεως της Θεοτόκου), is a very well preserved Byzantine monument in Pieria, Greece. "Kontariotissa" refers to the name of the modern community that originated near the church.

Location 

On a hill on the northwestern outskirts of the village Kontariotissa, about 6.5 kilometers southwest of Katerini.

The church 

Judging by the shape (morphology) of the building, it was built at the time of the Byzantine Iconoclasm or earlier. The construction is dated to the 7th century, structural changes took place in the 11th century and in the 15th century the building was restored. Parts of the exterior wall show various styles of stonework. The construction of the church is said to be related to the simultaneous destruction and abandonment of ancient Dion.

The building has a cylindrical dome supported by four round pillars and has a chapel in the north and south. The apse, delimited by a carved wooden iconostasis, in the eastern part of the church, is bounded by a three-part window. Apse, dome and parts of the walls are decorated with murals. Nothing is left of the original decor, the visible frescoes date back to the 15th century. Some of the terracotta floor tiles are labeled "Dion". The early parts of the structure are similar to the basilica of Agia Sophia in Thessaloniki. Similar features were found in other Greek churches of the 8th and 9th centuries. Possibly the church was used as a monastery church.

See also
Agia Triada Monastery, Sparmos

Literature 
 Helen Glykatzi, The Splendour of Orthodoxy: 2000 years history, monuments, art, Volume 2, Ekdotike Athenon, Dezember 2000, 
 Ikonoklasmus: Tania Velmans (Hrsg.): Ikonen: Ursprung und Bedeutung. Belser, Stuttgart 2002, 
 S.Curcic, Architecture in the Balkans. From Diocletian to Suleyman the Magnificent, Yale University Press, New Haven and London 2010,

Sources 
 BΥΖΑΝΤΙΝΟΣ ΝΑΟΣ ΠΑΝΑΓΙΑΣ ΚΟΥΝΤΟΥΡΙΩΤΙΣΣΗΣ - ΚΟΝΤΟΥΡΙΩΤΙΣΣΗΣ, Efi Doulgkeri, Archaeologist, 27. Ephorate, Department Byzantine Monuments, Katerini, Greece
 Α.Μέντζος, Η εκκλησιαστική αρχιτεκτονική της Πιερίας στην πρώϊμη βυζαντινή περίοδο, Επιστημονικό Συνέδριο "Η Πιερία στα Βυζαντινά και Νεώτερα χρόνια 1, Θεσσαλονίκη 1985, pages 160-161.

References 

Byzantine church buildings in Central Macedonia
Buildings and structures in Pieria (regional unit)
7th-century churches in Greece